The 1922 Colorado Agricultural Aggies football team represented Colorado Agricultural College (now known as Colorado State University) in the Rocky Mountain Conference (RMC) during the 1922 college football season.  In their 12th season under head coach Harry W. Hughes, the Aggies compiled a 5–2–1 record, finished second in the RMC, and outscored all opponents by a total of 179 to 38.

Schedule

References

Colorado Agricultural
Colorado State Rams football seasons
Colorado Agricultural Aggies football